Tamar & Vince is an American reality television series that debuted on September 20, 2012, and airs on WE tv. It is a spin-off of Braxton Family Values. In June 2013, Tamar & Vince was renewed for a ten-episode second season that premiered on September 5, 2013. The first season acquired 5.6 million total viewers for the network. The third season premiered on October 23, 2014, and consists of eight episodes. The fourth season premiered on December 10, 2015. The show's fifth and final season premiered on November 9, 2017.

Premise
The first season follows Tamar Braxton through her journey to superstardom, and also features the struggles she and Vince encounter in their marriage. The second season encompasses the creation of Tamar's new album, Love and War, the promotional tour for the album, Tamar's pregnancy and the arrival of the couple's first child. The fourth season chronicled Tamar's health struggles with pulmonary embolisms. The fifth season chronicled Tamar and Vince as they reach a breaking point in their career and marriage and as Tamar encompasses the creation of her fifth studio album Bluebird of Happiness and Vince is on a quest to reclaim his own life and his health by risking his own life having skin removal surgery. The show's theme song, "You're My Monday & My Friday", was performed by Tamar and Vince.

Episodes

Season 1 (2012)

Season 2 (2013)

Season 3 (2014)

Season 4 (2015–16)

Season 5 (2017)

References

External links
 
 

2010s American reality television series
2012 American television series debuts
2017 American television series endings
English-language television shows
African-American reality television series
Television shows set in Los Angeles
American television spin-offs
Reality television spin-offs
Television series by Magical Elves
Tamar Braxton